"Humpin'" is a 1980 song by The Gap Band, from their fifth album The Gap Band III released as a single in 1981. The original B-side, "No Hiding Place", was originally released on The Gap Band II. The song had mixed chart success, only peaking at #60 R&B, but busting into the top-20 on the dance charts. "Humpin'" is a fan-favorite, featured on almost all of the band's compilation albums Like their previous release, "Burn Rubber on Me", "Humpin'" was later packaged and placed as part of a single with "Yearning for Your Love" as the A-side.

Sampling
To date, the song has been sampled four times:
 "Humpin'" by the College Boyz from their 1992 album Radio Fusion Radio.
 "Bumpin'" by Paperboy from his 1992 album The Nine Yards.
 "You Got Me Humpin'" by Adina Howard from her 1995 album Do You Wanna Ride?
 "Doggfather" from Snoop Doggy Dogg's 1996 album Tha Doggfather. This song featured the Gap Band's lead singer, Charlie Wilson, who worked extensively with Snoop on the whole Tha Doggfather album.

References

1980 songs
1981 singles
The Gap Band songs
Songs written by Charlie Wilson (singer)
Songs written by Lonnie Simmons
Songs written by Rudy Taylor
Mercury Records singles